The Makati Poblacion Park, often shortened to Poblacion Park, is an urban linear park along the south bank of the Pasig River in Metro Manila, the Philippines. As its name suggests, it is located in Barangay Poblacion, Makati and was formerly known as Casa Hacienda Park. The park is the largest of three public parks in Makati's old downtown area situated at the site of a former plantation house. It is operated by the Department of Environmental Services Parks and Green Division of the City Government of Makati.

Description

The roughly three-block riverside park bordered by J. P. Rizal Avenue to the south sits in the historic Heritage District of Makati located just across from the Museo ng Makati. This neo-classical building with oyster shell window shutters built in 1918 at a plaza known as Plaza Trece de Agosto (now an extension of J.P. Rizal Avenue) served as Makati's presidencia or municipal hall until 1961. The park is also near the barangay hall of Poblacion.

Poblacion Park features an amphitheater, children's playground, stone benches, gazeboes, multipurpose sheds and solar lamp posts. The adjacent Poblacion Covered Court is a basketball court that also serves as a venue for local gatherings. A  extension of the park eastwards to Rockwell Center was inaugurated in June 2016 by the then-Mayor of Makati Romulo Peña.

History
The land for the park was acquired by the city of Makati after World War II as a donation from Ayala y Compañía. It was the site of a large bahay na bato that served as an administrative building for the then vast Jesuit hacienda of San Pedro de Macati.
 Ownership of the estate was transferred several times after the Jesuits were expelled from the Philippines in the late 18th century. It passed on to the Marquess of Villamediana, Don José Col, Don Manuel Gómez, and then to Don Simeón Bernardino Vélez. It was in 1851 when Don José Bonifacio Roxas purchased it for 50,000 Spanish dollars and made it the commercial base of Casa Roxas, the precursor of Ayala y Compañía (now Ayala Corporation).

The casa hacienda was located in the then village of Buenavista that sat on an elevated plateau overlooking the Pasig River. It was accessible from the river via stone steps or hagdang bato located just beside the plantation house. The Zobel de Ayala family managed their estate here from their headquarters at the casa hacienda until post-independence when the house was demolished and the site turned into an open space.

Gallery

See also
 List of parks in Metro Manila

References

Parks in Makati
Linear parks